The following Union Army units and commanders fought in the Battle of Spotsylvania Court House (May 8–21, 1864) of the American Civil War. The Confederate order of battle is listed separately. Order of battle compiled from the casualty returns and the reports.

Abbreviations used

Military rank
 LTG = Lieutenant General
 MG = Major General
 BG = Brigadier General
 Col = Colonel
 Ltc = Lieutenant Colonel
 Maj = Major
 Cpt = Captain

Other
 w = wounded
 k = killed
 c = captured

Forces operating against Richmond May 8–16, 1864
LTG Ulysses S. Grant, General-in-Chief, Union armies

Escort:
 5th United States Cavalry, Companies B, F and K

IX Corps

MG Ambrose E. Burnside

 Chief of Staff: MG John G. Parke

Army of the Potomac

MG George G. Meade

General Staff:
 Chief of Staff: MG Andrew A. Humphreys
 Assistant Adjutant General: BG Seth Williams
 Chief Quartermaster: BG Rufus Ingalls

General Headquarters:

Provost Guard: BG Marsena R. Patrick
 1st Massachusetts Cavalry, Companies C and D
 80th New York (20th Militia)
 3rd Pennsylvania Cavalry
 68th Pennsylvania
 114th Pennsylvania

Engineer Troops:
 50th New York Engineers
 Battalion United States Engineers

Guards and Orderlies:
 Independent Company Oneida (New York) Cavalry

II Corps

MG Winfield S. Hancock

Escort:
 1st Vermont Cavalry, Company M

V Corps

MG Gouverneur K. Warren

Provost Guard:
 12th New York Battalion

VI Corps

MG John Sedgwick (k)

BG Horatio G. Wright

Escort:
 8th Pennsylvania Cavalry, Company A

Cavalry Corps

MG Philip H. Sheridan

Escort:
 6th United States

Artillery
BG Henry J. Hunt
| 2nd Brigade Horse Artillery
  
Cpt Dunbar R. Ransom
|
 1st United States, Batteries E and G
 1st United States, Batteries H and I
 1st United States, Battery K
 2nd United States, Battery A
 2nd United States, Battery G
 3rd United States, Batteries C, F, and K
|-
| Artillery Park
  
Ltc Freeman McGilvery
|
 15th New York Heavy, 2nd Battalion
|}

See also
 Wilderness Union order of battle
 Cold Harbor Union order of battle

Notes

References
 Rhea, Gordon C. The Battles for Spotsylvania Court House and the Road to Yellow Tavern May 7–12, 1864. Baton Rouge: Louisiana State University Press, 1997. 
 Rhea, Gordon C. To The North Anna River: Grant and Lee May 13–25, 1864. Baton Rouge: Louisiana State University Press, 2000. 
 U.S. War Department, The War of the Rebellion: a Compilation of the Official Records of the Union and Confederate Armies, U.S. Government Printing Office, 1880–1901.

American Civil War orders of battle